Anderlini is an Italian surname. Notable people with the surname include:

Franco Anderlini (1921–1984), Italian volleyball coach
Ken Anderlini (1962–2007), Canadian film director
Nino Anderlini (born 1926), Italian cross-country skier
Pietro Anderlini (1687–1755), Italian painter

Italian-language surnames